The 2003 invasion of Iraq, which lasted from March 20 to May 1, 2003, resulted in a small number of U.S. and Coalition Prisoners of war.

507th Maintenance Company

March 23rd Ambush and Capture 
A majority of the prisoners of war were captured from the ambush of the 507th Maintenance Company. Separated from a larger convoy, they were ambushed in the Iraqi-held town of Nasiriyah on March 23, 2003. Out of thirty-three soldiers present, eleven were killed and seven were captured in the firefight. Several weapons were jammed in the firefight. The following soldiers were captured by the Iraqi forces:

Iraqi TV interview
Soon after their capture, Jessica Lynch was taken to an Iraqi hospital due to her serious injuries. The other five POWs, bloodied and beaten, were interviewed by the Iraqi TV, and the footage shown worldwide by the Al Jazeera. In the interview, Private First Class Patrick Miller was asked why he came to Iraq; his reply was "I came to fix broken stuff." He was then asked if he came to shoot Iraqis, he answered, "No, I came to shoot only if I am shot at. They don't bother me, I don't bother them."

Patrick Miller answered a question on a CNN newscast. "I thought they were going to kill me," Miller is quoted as saying about the capture, "That was the first thing I asked when they captured me: 'Are 
you going to kill me?' They said no. . . . I still didn't believe them."

March 24th Downed Helicopter and Capture 
On March 24, they were joined by Chief Chief Warrant Officers Officers David Williams, 31, and Ronald Young Jr., 26, whose AH-64 Apache helicopter from the 1-227 Helicopter Attack Battalion had been shot down in central Iraq during the attack on Karbala.

Relocation and Rescue 
The prisoners had been taken to Baghdad, where they were isolated in separate prison cells. As American troops came closer, the soldiers were shifted from building to building.

As it became clear that the war was over for the Iraqis, some of their captors approached a Marine unit from the 3rd Light Armored Reconnaissance Battalion, Delta Co., 3rd Platoon which was a part of Task Force Tripoli that had been pushing up toward Tikrit, Saddam Hussein's hometown.  A Marine battalion was sent to check on intelligence and found the seven POWs with a confused Iraqi guard unit, whose officers had fled.

On 13 April 2003, 21 days after the 507th members were captured, members of the 3rd Light Armored Recon burst in on the Iraqi guards who gave up without a fight.  Ordering everyone on the floor, a Marine gave an order to "stand up if you're American!"  Given dirty prison clothes and fed little food, the prisoners had lost a lot of weight and with their garb, and beards they looked like Iraqis. "At first," Spc. Shoshana Johnson remembers that, "They didn't realize I was American. They said, 'Get down, get down,' and one of them said, 'No, she's American.'"

Within hours, the seven were on their way to Kuwait International Airport inside a Marine Corps KC-130 transport plane, the first stop before the United States. They told their stories to two reporters accompanying them on the flight.  "I broke down. I was like, 'Oh my God, I'm home,'" Johnson said.

War crimes perpetrated against Coalition forces
During the 2003 invasion of Iraq, Iraqi Saddam Fedayeen irregular forces were involved in executing several Coalition prisoners of war.

Sergeant Donald Walters was initially reported to have been killed in the March 23 ambush of the 507th Maintenance Company. However, witnesses later reported that they had seen Walters being guarded by several Fedayeen in front of a building. Forensics work later found Walters' blood in front of the building and blood spatter suggesting he died from two gunshot wounds to the back at close range. This led the Army to conclude that Walters had been executed after being captured.

Jessica Lynch was reportedly raped and sodomized by Iraqi forces, based on scars, though she has no recollection of it happening.

Also on March 23, the British Army engineering unit made a wrong turn near the town of Az Zubayr, which was still held by Iraqi forces. The unit was ambushed and Sapper Luke Allsopp and Staff Sergeant Simon Cullingworth became separated from the rest. Both were captured and executed by Iraqi forces. In 2006, a video of Allsopp lying on the ground surrounded by Iraqi irregular forces was discovered.

Marine Sergeant Fernando Padilla-Ramirez was reported missing from his supply unit after an ambush north of Nasiriyah on March 28. His body was later dragged through the streets of Ash Shatrah and hung in the town square. His body was later taken down and buried by sympathetic locals. His body was discovered by U.S. forces on April 10.

In addition, the showing of captured soldiers on television, as was done with some of the captured soldiers of the 507th Maintenance Company, was a violation of Article 13 the Third Geneva Convention, which states that prisoners of war be protected from "public curiosity".

See also

  Ahmed Kousay Altaie - A U.S. Army soldier who was captured by Iraqi insurgents and executed
  Wassef Ali Hassoun - A U.S. Marine who claimed to be captured by Iraqi insurgents; later discovered to be a hoax
 2004 Iraq KBR convoy ambush - Capture and execution of Keith Matthew Maupin, a U.S. Army soldier
 June 2006 abduction of U.S. soldiers in Iraq - Capture and execution of Kristian Menchaca and Thomas L. Tucker, two U.S. Army soldiers
 Karbala provincial headquarters raid - Capture and execution of Brian Freeman, Jacob Fritz, Jonathan Chism and Shawn Falter, four U.S. Army soldiers
 May 2007 abduction of U.S. soldiers in Iraq - Capture and execution of Alex Ramon Jimenez, Joseph John Anzack and Byron Wayne Fouty, three U.S. Army soldiers

References

Further reading
 Wright, Evan (2004), Generation Kill, Berkley Publishing Group 
 Lowry, Richard S. (2006), Marines in the Garden of Eden, Berkley Publishing Group 

American military personnel of the Iraq War

Iraq War prisoners of war
Military logistics of the United States
Women in the United States military
Prisoners of war held by Iraq